Jorma Ilmari Suokko (born May 27, 1940) is a Finnish retired professional ice hockey player who played in the SM-liiga.  He played for KooVee. He competed in the men's tournament at the 1964 Winter Olympics. He was inducted into the Finnish Hockey Hall of Fame in 1986.

References

External links
 
 Finnish Hockey Hall of Fame bio

1940 births
Living people
Finnish ice hockey defencemen
KOOVEE players
Vaasan Sport players
Ice hockey people from Tampere
Olympic ice hockey players of Finland
Ice hockey players at the 1964 Winter Olympics